The V.League 1 is the top-level professional volleyball league for both men and women in Japan. The league started in 1994.

The competitions are organized by the Japan Volleyball League Organization. In 2006 the name V.League was changed to V.Premier League. In 2018 the name V.Premier League was changed to V.League Division 1 (V1).

Clubs (2022–23 season)
The League currently consists of the following member clubs:

Men (10 teams)
JTEKT Stings
Panasonic Panthers
 JT Thunders Hiroshima
Toray Arrows
Wolf Dogs Nagoya
Tokyo Great Bears
Oita Miyoshi Weisse Adler
VC Nagano Tridents
Suntory Sunbirds
Sakai Blazers

Women (12 teams)
JT Marvelous
Okayama Seagulls
Saitama Ageo Medics
Denso Airybees
Toyota Auto Body Queenseis
Toray Arrows
Hisamitsu Springs
NEC Red Rockets
Hitachi Rivale
Kurobe AquaFairies
PFU BlueCats
Victorina Himeji

Previous winners
1967–68 to 1993–94: Japan Volleyball League
1994–95 to 2005–06: V.League
2006–07 to 2017–18: V.Premier League
2018–19 to present: V.League Division 1

Men

Women

Spectators
Records show from the new born V.League Division 1 from Season 2018/19.

Sponsor

See also 

 V.Challenge League
 Emperor's Cup and Empress' Cup All Japan Volleyball Championship
 Kurowashiki All Japan Volleyball Tournament
 Asian Men's Club Volleyball Championship
 Asian Women's Club Volleyball Championship
 FIVB Volleyball Men's Club World Championship

References

External links
  
  Japan V.League Division 1. women.volleybox.net 

Volleyball competitions in Japan
Sports leagues in Japan
Japan
Sports leagues established in 1994
1994 establishments in Japan
Professional sports leagues in Japan